Ang Thong or Angthong is one of the central provinces (changwat) of Thailand. The name "Ang Thong" means 'gold basin', thought to have derived from the basin-like geography of the area, and the golden color of the rice grown in the region.

Neighboring provinces are (from north clockwise) Sing Buri, Lopburi, Ayutthaya, and Suphan Buri.

Ang Thong native handicrafts include moulded court dolls, firebrick, and wickerwork.

Ang Thong has more than 200 Buddhist temples, but there are nine distinctive temples that are promoted as "Paying Homage to Nine Auspicious Temples" consists of Wat Chaiyo Worawihan, Wat Khun Inthapramun, Wat Pa Mok Worawihan, Wat Tonson, Wat Mahanam, Wat Thasutthawat, Wat Siroi, Wat Khian and, Wat Muang where the Great Buddha of Thailand is enshrined.

Geography
Ang Thong occupies a low river plain, created by the Chao Phraya and the Noi Rivers. It has neither mountains nor forests, but consists of mostly agricultural land. The two rivers, together with many canals (khlongs), provide enough water for rice farming.

History

Ang Thong was historically known as Wiset Chai Chan, on the Noi River. It was an important border town of the Ayutthaya Kingdom during the wars with Burma, as the Noi River served as a natural obstacle for advancing troops.

During the reign of King Taksin after the fall of Ayutthaya, the main city of the province was moved to the Chao Phraya River, and named Ang Thong, as the Noi River had become silted and too shallow for transportation.

Ang Thong is the provenance of Likay, the native folk song, and the hometown of Nai Dok and Nai Thongkaeo, two heroes of the Bang Rachan Battle.

Khun Rong Palat Chu is another local hero of Ang Thong. His heroism is little known when compared to the villagers of Bang Rachan because only two lines were recorded in the Thai chronicles. He grouped up and led four hundred volunteer sword fighters under the name "Kong Attamat" to accompany the royal army from the capital during the royal army's settlement at Kui Buri of Prachuap Khiri Khan. His group received a command to obstruct the Burmese army 8,000 people at Ao Wa Khao (in present-day Ao Noi, Mueang Prachuap Khiri Khan) in 1759 when King Alaungpaya of Burma invaded Myeik (Burmese–Siamese War (1759–60)) which was a part of Ayutthaya Kingdom at that time. In the end, they all died of four hundred people. Nowadays, there is a monument built to commemorate his heroism at Wat Si Roi, Wiset Chai Chan.

Symbols
The provincial seal shows some golden ears of rice in a bowl of water. This symbolizes the fertility of the province as one of the major producers of rice. The provincial tree is the gaub tree (Diospyros malabarica). The provincial fish is red tailed tinfoil (Barbonymus altus).

Administrative divisions

Provincial government
The province is divided into seven districts (amphoes). The districts are further subdivided into 73 subdistricts (tambons) and 513 villages (mubans).
Mueang Ang Thong
Chaiyo
Pa Mok
Pho Thong
Sawaeng Ha
Wiset Chai Chan
Samko

Local government
As of 26 November 2019 there are: one Ang Thong Provincial Administration Organisation and 21 municipal (thesaban) areas in the province. Ang Thong has town (thesaban mueang) status. Further 20 subdistrict municipalities (thesaban tambon). The non-municipal areas are administered by 43 Subdistrict Administrative Organisations - SAO (ongkan borihan suan tambon).

Human achievement index 2017

Since 2003, United Nations Development Programme (UNDP) in Thailand has tracked progress on human development at sub-national level using the human achievement index (HAI), a composite index covering all the eight key areas of human development. National Economic and Social Development Board (NESDB) has taken over this task since 2017.

Notable people
Somsak Prissanananthakul: politician
Pleumjit Thinkaow: world-class volleyball player
Pipob Thongchai: activist
Jermsak Pinthong: economist, political critic, TV host
Chaiya Mitchai: likay dancer, singer, actor, TV host
Kohtee Aramboy: comedian
Ja R-Siam: singer

References

External links

Ang Thong provincial map, coat of arms and postage stamp
Flag of Ang Thong province

 
Provinces of Thailand